Vestnes Church is a parish church of the Church of Norway in Vestnes Municipality in Møre og Romsdal county, Norway. It is located in the village of Vestnes. It is the church for the Vestnes parish which is part of the Indre Romsdal prosti (deanery) in the Diocese of Møre. The white, wooden church was built in a long church design in 1872 by Anders Johnsen Berg who used plans drawn up by the architect Jacob Wilhelm Nordan. The church seats about 480 people.

History
The earliest existing historical records of the church date back to 1589, when it was an annex to the Old Veøy Church. At that time, it was already an old stave church. During the 1640s, there were two additions built onto the church, both in a timber-frame construction: a transept to the north and to the south, creating a cruciform floor plan. In 1680, the old church was torn down and a new church was constructed just east of the cemetery which surrounded the old church building. The new church was completed in 1682. Some of the useful materials from the old church were reused in the new building. The new building was a cruciform design that was built with a timber-frame construction. Nearly 200 years later in 1872, a new church (the present church building) was built a short distance to the east of the previous church. When it was completed, the old church was torn down. The new church was built by the master carpenter Anders Johnsen Berg who used designs by the architect Jacob Wilhelm Nordan.

Media gallery

See also
List of churches in Møre

References

Vestnes
Churches in Møre og Romsdal
Long churches in Norway
Wooden churches in Norway
19th-century Church of Norway church buildings
Churches completed in 1872
14th-century establishments in Norway